Alec Purdie (born November 24, 1988) is an American soccer player who most recently played for New England Revolution in Major League Soccer.

Career

College and Amateur
Purdie played college soccer at the Indiana University between 2007 and 2011. During his time at Indiana, Purdie was named Captain of the team, earned first-team All-Big Ten honors as a senior, earned Offensive MVP honors and later Big Ten player of the week/National player of the week accolades for helping lead Indiana to the title at the Mike Berticelli Memorial Tournament. After the season had concluded, he was invited to the 2012 MLS Combine in Ft. Lauderdale, Florida.

Purdie spent time playing with USL Premier Development League club Indiana Invaders between 2007 and 2009.

Professional
New England Revolution selected Purdie in the second round (No. 22 overall) of the 2012 MLS Supplemental Draft.

Purdie made his debut as a 70th-minute substitute during a 1–0 win against Portland Timbers on March 24, 2012.

Before the 2013 season he signed a three-month contract with [Swedish Football Division 3] club FK Älmeboda/Linneryd to train and gain fitness after leaving New England Revolution. After his 3-month stint in Vaxjo, he spent time going on trials throughout Sweden. In January 2014, he had to decide whether to stay in Sweden or to take a job offer, and retired from playing.

References

External links
 

1988 births
Living people
American soccer players
Association football midfielders
Indiana Hoosiers men's soccer players
Indiana Invaders players
Major League Soccer players
New England Revolution draft picks
New England Revolution players
People from Elkhart, Indiana
Soccer players from Indiana
USL League Two players